A basionym, when written Solidago lateriflora L., for Symphyotrichum lateriflorum
 A synonym, when written Solidago lateriflora Raf. ex DC., for Solidago caesia